Kazakhstan participated in the 2018 Asian Games in Jakarta and Palembang, Indonesia, from 18 August to 2 September 2018.

Medalists

The following Kazakhstan competitors won medals at the Games.

|  style="text-align:left; width:78%; vertical-align:top;"|

|  style="text-align:left; width:22%; vertical-align:top;"|

Competitors 
The following is a list of the number of competitors representing Kazakhstan that participated at the Games:

Demonstration events

Archery 

Recurve

Compound

Artistic swimming 

FR: Reserved in free routine; TR: Reserved in technical routine.

Athletics

Basketball 

Summary

5x5 basketball
Kazakhstan men's and women's basketball team entered the competition and drawn in the group D for the men's and in the group X for the women's.

Men's tournament

Roster
The following is the Kazakhstan roster in the men's basketball tournament of the 2018 Asian Games.

Group D

Women's tournament

Roster
The following is the Kazakhstan roster in the women's basketball tournament of the 2018 Asian Games.

}

Group X

Quarter-final

Classification 5th–8th

Fifth place game

3x3 basketball
The country also set a men's and women's team that competed in 3-on-3 basketball.

Men's tournament

Roster
The following is the Kazakhstan roster in the men's 3x3 basketball tournament of the 2018 Asian Games.
Anuar Shakirov (8)
Vassiliy Belozor (9)
Andrey Litvinenko (45)
Ruslan Aitkali (47)

Pool D

Quarter-final

Women's tournament

Roster
The following is the Kazakhstan roster in the women's 3x3 basketball tournament of the 2018 Asian Games.
Madina Baibolekova (1)
Alexandra Petelina (13)
Anastassiya Arzamastseva (14)
Luiza Zukova (77)

Pool C

Bowling 

Men

Women

Boxing 

Men

Women

Canoeing

Slalom

Sprint

Qualification legend: QF=Final; QS=Semifinal

Cycling

Mountain biking

Road

Track

Sprint

Team sprint

 Riders who entered the competition but did not participating in any phase of the team event.
Qualification legend: FA=Gold medal final; FB=Bronze medal final

Pursuit

 Riders who entered the competition but did not participating in any phase of the team event.
Qualification legend: FA=Gold medal final; FB=Bronze medal final

Keirin

Qualification legend: FA=Gold medal final; FB=Bronze medal final

Omnium

Madison

Esports (demonstration) 

StarCraft II

League of Legends and Pro Evolution Soccer

Fencing 

Individual

Team

Field hockey 

Kazakhstan entered both men's and women's team that were placed in the pool B respectively.

Summary

Men's tournament 

Roster

Pool B

Eleventh place game

Women's tournament 

Roster

Pool B

Ninth place game

Golf 

Men

Women

Gymnastics

Handball 

Kazakhstan entered in group A at the women's team event.

Summary

Women's tournament

Roster

Irina Danilova
Olga Tankina
Sevara Rejemtova
Anna Kazachenko
Veronika Khardina
Kristina Kapralova
Yelena Suyazova
Tatyana Parfenova
Arailym Abdikhamit
Irina Alexandrova
Tatyana Davydova
Natalya Ilyina
Mariya Pupchenkova
Valeriya Karavayeva
Viktoriya Kolotinskaya
Dana Abilda

Group A

5–8th place semifinal

Fifth place game

Ju-jitsu 

Men

Women

Judo 

Men

Women

Mixed

Karate

Kurash 

Men

Women

Modern pentathlon

Rowing 

Men

Women

Rugby sevens 

Kazakhstan rugby sevens women's team drawn in the group B at the Games.

Women's tournament 

Squad
The following is the Kazakhstan squad in the women's rugby sevens tournament of the 2018 Asian Games.

Head coach:  Valeriy Popov

Veronika Stepanyuga
Nigora Nurmatova
Karina Proskurina
Yeva Bekker
Vlada Odnoletok
Olessya Teryayeva
Kundyzay Baktybayeva
Anna Yakovleva
Svetlana Klyuchnikova
Balzhan Koishybayeva
Darya Tkachyova
Lyudmila Korotkikh

Group B

Quarterfinal

Semifinal

Bronze medal game

Sailing

Men

Women

Sambo

Shooting 

Men

Women

Mixed team

Sport climbing 

Speed

Speed relay

Combined

Swimming 

Men

Women

Taekwondo

Poomsae

Kyorugi

Tennis 

Men

Women

Mixed

Triathlon 

Individual

Volleyball

Beach volleyball

Indoor volleyball

Men's tournament

Team roster
The following is the Kazakhstan roster in the men's volleyball tournament of the 2018 Asian Games.

Head coach: Igor Nikolchenko

Pool C

13th–20th quarterfinal

17th place game

Women's tournament

Team roster
The following is the Kazakhstani roster in the women's volleyball tournament of the 2018 Asian Games.

Head coach: Vyacheslav Shapran

Pool B

Quarterfinal

5–8th place semifinal

5th place game

Water polo 

Summary

Men's tournament

Team roster
Head coach:  Nemanja Knežević

Pavel Lipilin (GK)
Yevgeniy Medvedev (D)
Ruslan Akhmetov (D)
Roman Pilipenko (CB)
Miras Aubakirov (D)
Alexey Shmider (D)
Murat Shakenov (D)
Altay Altayev (CF)
Rustam Ukumanov (D) (C)
Mikhail Ruday (CF)
Ravil Manafov (CF)
Yulian Verdesh (CB)
Valeriy Shlemov (GK)

Group A

Quarter-final

Semifinal

Gold medal game

Women's tournament

Team roster
Head coach: Marat Naurazbekov

Alexandra Zharkimbayeva (GK) (C)
Oxana Saichuk (D)
Aizhan Akilbayeva (D)
Anna Turova (CB)
Anastassiya Yeremina (CB)
Darya Roga (D)
Anna Novikova (D)
Sivilya Raiter (CF)
Shakhzoda Mansurova (D)
Zamira Myrzabekova (CF)
Anastassiya Mirshina (D)
Anastassiya Murataliyeva (D)
Azhar Alibayeva (GK)

Round robin

Wrestling 

Men's freestyle

Men's Greco-Roman

Women's freestyle

Wushu 

Taolu

Sanda

Key: * TV – Technical victory.

See also
 Kazakhstan at the 2018 Asian Para Games

References

Nations at the 2018 Asian Games
2018
Asian Games